Air Marshal Abdur Rahim Khan  (25 October 1925 – 28 February 1990) was a three-star air officer who served as the last Commander-in-Chief of the  Pakistan Air Force under President Yahya Khan, from 1969 until 1972.

In 1972, Air-Marshal Abdur Rahim Khan along with the Pakistan Army's Commander-in-Chief Lieutenant-General Gul Hassan was prematurely retired from military service over his refusal to use Pakistan Air Force aircraft in Lyallpur to buzz over crowds of police agitation, demanding pay raise. Later he joined the  Foreign Service and served as Pakistan Ambassador to Spain till 13 April 1977, when along with General Gul Hassan Khan, who was then the Pakistan Ambassador to Greece, he resigned as a protest against the rigging of the general elections held in 1977

Biography

Family background
Abdur Rahim Khan was born in Rawalpindi, Punjab in India on 25 July 1925. He hailed from a Punjabi family.

Career in the military

World War II and Pakistan
He joined the Royal Indian Air Force (RIAF) and was commissioned as Flying officer in 1943. He participated in the RIAF's bombing missions against Japan in the Burma theater in World War II.

After the independence of Pakistan as a result of partition of India on 14 August 1947, he opted for Pakistan and joined the newly established Pakistan Air Force (PAF) while taking up the instructor position in the Air Force Academy (the RPAF college). In 1950s, he was sent to United Kingdom where he attended the Imperial Defense College where he graduated with a staff course degree. He later went to the United States to attend the staff college and underwent to complete a pilot's training on the jet aircraft.

In 1952, he became the first Pakistani pilot (and probably the first Asian pilot) to break the sound barrier. Upon returning to Pakistan, he was given the command of No. 11 Squadron (Arrows), the only squadron equipped with jet fighters. He also commanded the No. 9 Squadron (Griffins).

His command assignment included his role as commandant of the Air War College and AOC of Masroor Air Force Base in Karachi, Sindh, Pakistan.

In 1965, Air Cdre Khan was appointed as Deputy Commander-in-Chief of Air Operations and participated in detailing the air operations during the second war with India.

Air Commander-in-Chief
On 1 September 1969, Air Commodore Khan was promoted to three-star rank, Air Marshal, and was appointed Commander in Chief of the Pakistan Air Force, serving under President Yahya Khan. During this time, he paid a visit to China to strengthened military relations between two nations.

In 1971, Air Marshal Khan led the PAF during the third war with India. He issued directives banning the Bengali pilots flying for the bombing missions after a one pilot attempted to defect to India, but the attempt was made unsuccessful by the second pilot.

Air Marshal Khan played a critical and pivotal role in turning over President Yahya Khan's administration and helped Zulfikar Ali Bhutto assuming the presidency on 20 December 1971. Air Marshal Khan became known as the strongest military influence in the country.

Ambassador of Pakistan to Spain
On 11 March 1972, Air Marshal Abdur Rahim Khan was appointed designate Pakistan Ambassador to Spain. He presented his diplomatic credentials to Juan Carlos I in Barcelona. On 13 April 1977, he resigned his post in protest against allegations of riggings during the general elections held in 1977. He immediately appealed and called for the removal of Prime Minister Bhutto over his undemocratic actions.

Death, personal life, and public image

After the military takeover of civilian government by General Zia-ul-Haq, the Chief of Army Staff, Abdul Rahim left the Ministry of Foreign Affairs and moved to United States. He bought an estate in Potomac, Maryland in the United States, and lived until his death due to Kidney failure on 28 February 1990.

Abdul Rahim Khan was married to Princess Mehrunissa Khan, the only child of the beloved but unofficial third queen of the Nawab of Rampur. They got married in London when Rahim Khan was serving as a Group-Captain (Col.) in the Air Force.

Abdul Rahim Khan was described as "soft‐spoken" and was fond of golf, polo, classical Indian music; and he avoided making slighting remarks about his Indian adversaries.

Awards and decorations

Foreign Decorations

See also 
Indo-Pakistani War of 1971

References

External links
Bio of Air Marshal A Rahim Khan

1925 births
1990 deaths
Punjabi people
People from Rawalpindi
People from Potomac, Maryland
Indian military personnel of World War II
Pakistan Air Force officers
Pakistani flying aces
Pakistani test pilots
Pakistani aviation record holders
Pakistan Air Force air marshals
Air marshals of the Indo-Pakistani War of 1971
K
Military personnel of the Indo-Pakistani War of 1965
Chiefs of Air Staff, Pakistan
Recipients of Hilal-i-Jur'at
Ambassadors of Pakistan to Spain
Pakistani expatriates in Spain
Pakistani emigrants to the United States
Deaths from kidney failure